Facundo Ferreyra (born 14 March 1991), nicknamed "Chucky", is an Argentine professional footballer who plays as a forward for Liga MX club Tijuana.

Club career

Banfield
Ferreyra came through the youth system at his home town club of Banfield, and was promoted to the first team in the 2008–09 season. He made six appearances in that season, three as a substitute, scoring one goal. His debut goal was a header against Argentinos Juniors in a 2–2 draw on 6 December 2008.

Ferreyra's next first team appearances came in the 2010–11 season, when he scored six goals in 19 games, including one against Boca Juniors to secure a 1–1 draw on 4 June 2011. He was among the 15 top league goalscorers for the season. On 3 January 2011, he signed a new three-year contract with Banfield.

Vélez Sársfield
Following Banfield's relegation at the end of the 2011–12 Argentine Primera División season, Ferreyra was transferred to Vélez Sársfield. During his first season playing for Vélez, Ferreyra was the top goalscorer for the team in their 2012 Inicial winning campaign, scoring 13 goals in 15 games. He was also joint top scorer of the championship along Ignacio Scocco. Ferreyra also started in the 2012–13 Superfinal, in which Vélez defeated Newell's Old Boys.

Shakhtar Donetsk
On 9 July 2013, Ferreyra signed a five-year contract with Ukrainian club Shakhtar Donetsk in a US$9 million transfer. He rarely featured for the club during his first season in Ukraine, but did manage to score six league goals from five starts as Shakhtar won their ninth league title.

Due to personal security concerns over the war in Donbass and the recent Malaysia Airlines Flight 17 crash, Ferreyra along with five other foreign teammates refused to return to Ukraine after a friendly match against Lyon on 20 July 2014. With the relocation of Shakhtar's training base to Kyiv and home games to be played in Lviv for the 2014–15 season and following talks with CEO Sergei Palkin, Ferreyra and his teammates returned to the club in late July.

Loan to Newcastle United
On 3 August 2014, Newcastle United signed Ferreyra on a season-long loan. The deal included a £6 million option to buy at the end of the season. However, Ferreyra struggled with the physical demands of English football, stating in an interview in the Newcastle Evening Chronicle "When I got here [Newcastle] I struggled to adapt ... it is a very physical league." On 29 May 2015 it was announced that Newcastle would not take up the option to buy Ferreyra and he would return to Shakhtar Donetsk without having played a single minute of first team football for Newcastle.

Return to Shakhtar
Ferreyra scored the first goal in the 2018 Ukrainian Cup Final as Shakhtar beat rivals Dynamo Kyiv 2–0.

Benfica
On 6 June 2018, Ferreyra signed a four-year contract with Portuguese club S.L. Benfica. The following 31 January, after being rarely used, he moved to La Liga side RCD Espanyol on loan until June 2020. He scored 1 goal in 9 games in La Liga in the second half of the 2018–19 season. In January 2021, Ferreyra and Benfica decided to mutually part ways, making Ferreyra a free-agent.

Celta
Upon his release from Benfica, Ferreyra signed a contract until the end of the 2020–21 season with Spanish club Celta de Vigo.

International career
Ferreyra is a former Argentina under-20 youth international. He was joint second top scorer at the 2011 South American Youth Championship with four tournament goals, helping Argentina to third place. He also played with the team at the 2011 FIFA U-20 World Cup.

Career statistics

Club

Honours
Vélez Sársfield
Argentine Primera División: 2012 Inicial, 2012–13 Superfinal

Shakhtar Donetsk
Ukrainian Premier League: 2013–14, 2016–17, 2017–18
Ukrainian Cup: 2015–16, 2016–17, 2017–18
Ukrainian Super Cup: 2014, 2015, 2017

Benfica
Primeira Liga: 2018–19

Argentina U20
 South American Youth Championship third place: 2011

Individual
Argentine Primera División top scorer: 2012 Inicial
Ukrainian Premier League top scorer: 2017–18

References

External links

 RCD Espanyol official profile 
 
 

1991 births
Living people
People from Lomas de Zamora
Argentine footballers
Association football forwards
Argentine Primera División players
Club Atlético Banfield footballers
Club Atlético Vélez Sarsfield footballers
Ukrainian Premier League players
Ukrainian Premier League top scorers
FC Shakhtar Donetsk players
Newcastle United F.C. players
Primeira Liga players
S.L. Benfica footballers
La Liga players
RCD Espanyol footballers
Argentina under-20 international footballers
Argentine expatriate footballers
Argentine expatriate sportspeople in Ukraine
Argentine expatriate sportspeople in England
Argentine expatriate sportspeople in Portugal
Argentine expatriate sportspeople in Spain
Expatriate footballers in Ukraine
Expatriate footballers in England
Expatriate footballers in Portugal
Expatriate footballers in Spain
Sportspeople from Buenos Aires Province